Qin Shutong (born November 1963) is a general (shangjiang) of the People's Liberation Army (PLA) serving as political commissar of the People's Liberation Army Ground Force, succeeding Liu Lei in January 2022. He is a representative of the 19th National Congress of the Chinese Communist Party.

Biography
Qin was born in Tai County (now Jiangyan District), Jiangsu, in November 1963. In March 2013, he became director of Political Department of the 31st Group Army, one year later, he was elevated to deputy political commissar. In September 2015, he was assigned political commissar of the 1st Group Army. He was reassigned as political commissar of the 75th Group Army in March 2017. In April 2018, he was made director of Political Department of the People's Liberation Army Ground Force. In January 2022, he rose to become political commissar of the People's Liberation Army Ground Force, succeeding Liu Lei.

Qin was promoted to the rank of major general (shaojiang) in July 2014, lieutenant general (zhongjiang) in June 2019, and general (shangjiang) in January 2022.

References

1968 births
Living people
People from Taizhou, Jiangsu
People's Liberation Army generals from Jiangsu
People's Republic of China politicians from Jiangsu
Chinese Communist Party politicians from Jiangsu